or Chisan is a Japanese sect of Shingon Buddhism. It is headquartered in Chishaku-in (temple) in Kyoto. Naritasan Shinshōji Temple in Narita is also an important temple and was founded in 940. Chisan-ha belongs to Tantric Buddhism.

See also
 Buzan-ha

References

Schools of Shingon Buddhism